is a fixed shooter video game developed and published by Jaleco for arcades in September 1983, and licensed to Taito for manufacture and distribution of the game in North America. The player controls a starship and must fire at enemies on the screen while avoiding projectiles. The game uses a pseudo-3D scrolling background, giving a sense of depth, and the player's ship has a sense of inertia while it is being controlled with the joystick.

Exerion was ported to the MSX, Family Computer, and SG-1000. Two sequels were released.

Gameplay

Exerion features parallax effects and inertia simulation. The player shoots formations of bizarre alien amoeba, egg-throwing birds and Pterosauric creatures, as well as UFOs while flying over the surface of a planet. The player has two types of guns: a slow double shot (unlimited) and a fast single shot (limited).

Reception

In Japan, Game Machine listed Exerion as the top-grossing new table arcade cabinet in November 1983, and then the top-grossing tablet cabinet in December 1983.

Legacy
The Family Computer version of the game is included in the compilation Jaleco Collection Vol. 1 for the PlayStation in 2003, as well as in the Game Boy Advance game JaJaMaru Jr. Denshoki Jaleco Memorial, along with five other Jaleco Family Computer games. The original arcade version was later released for the PlayStation 4 as part of the Arcade Archives label on October 23, 2014 in Japan and on July 7, 2015 in North America and also on the Nintendo Switch in the Nintendo eShop by Hamster Corporation as part of the same series.

Two sequels to the game were released. Exerion II: Zorni was released for the MSX in 1984 alongside a port of the original arcade game. The second, Exerizer, was released for arcades in 1987, which was released in North America by Nichibutsu under the title Sky Fox. The player's ship, the Fighter EX, is a playable character in Jaleco's Game Tengoku series.

Notes

References

External links
 
 Exerion at Arcade Archives Page

1983 video games
Arcade video games
City Connection franchises
Jaleco games
MSX games
Nintendo Entertainment System games
Nintendo Switch games
PlayStation 4 games
SG-1000 games
Fixed shooters
Tose (company) games
Virtual Console games
Virtual Console games for Wii U
Taito arcade games
Multiplayer and single-player video games
Video games developed in Japan
Hamster Corporation games